Petra Bagust is a New Zealand television presenter, radio host, podcaster and media chaplain, perhaps best known for her role as co-presenter of TVNZ's morning show Breakfast.

Career
Bagust grew up in Christchurch and attended University of Canterbury, where she completed a Bachelor of Fine Arts in 1995. She began her television career at local TV station Cry TV. She later co-hosted youth TV series Ice TV, its sequel Ice As, and later a wide range of programming include travel shows, real estate shows, and game shows. She was also a regular host of the annual event Coca-Cola Christmas in the Park and St Paul's GLOW Carols by Glowstick.

In 2008, 2009 and 2010 she hosted New Zealand program What's Really In Our Food?, broadcast on TV3.  At the same time, she hosted a weekly radio programme with Pat Brittenden on Newstalk ZB.

She changed networks in 2011 to present TVNZ's Breakfast alongside Corin Dann. In October 2012 she announced her departure from the show and was replaced the following year by Toni Street.

In March 2022, Bagust launched a Rova podcast called Grey Areas, featuring her speaking with guests including Jackie Brown, Wendyl Nissan, Karen Walker, Robert Rakete, Miriama Kamo and Robyn Malcolm, about growing older in Aoteoroa. It soon became the top podcast in New Zealand and stayed in the top ten Apple Podcasts for eight weeks. Season two was launched in September 2022.

In February 2023, Bagust launched a weekly two hour radio show that she hosts on Today FM called Sunday Sanctuary.

Bagust is also a media chaplain with the Christian Broadcasting Association.

Awards
Bagust was nominated for her work on 'What's Really In Our Food?' in the Qantas Film and Television Awards three years running, 2008, 2009 and 2010.

Personal life
Bagust married freelance cameraman Hamish Wilson in 2000; the couple have three children. Bagust's departure from morning television was explained as wanting to spend more time with her family.

She is a Christian.

See also
List of New Zealand television personalities

References

1972 births
Place of birth missing (living people)
New Zealand television presenters
New Zealand women television presenters
University of Canterbury alumni
People from Christchurch
Living people